Alpaugh is a census-designated place (CDP) in Tulare County, California, United States. The population was 1,026 at the 2010 census, up from 761 at the 2000 census.

It is named for John Alpaugh, one of the officers of the Home Extension Colony which reclaimed (or land speculated on) the land the town is built on.

Geography

The site is located on the historic shoreline of Tulare Lake, once the largest freshwater lake in the USA outside of the Great lakes.  Other towns built on its historic shores include Lemoore and Kettleman City.

Despite being on the edge of the ancient Tulare lakebed, the town is without access to safe drinking water, as high levels of Arsenic are found in the municipal water supply. Locals are forced to drink, cook and bathe using bottled water or expose themselves to this hazard. {https://environmentalintegrity.org/wp-content/uploads/CA-Arsenic-Report.pdf}

History
Alpaugh's location (once also called Hog Island, Root Island, and Atwell's Island) was once either on an island or a narrow peninsula near the south end of the huge and rich Tulare Lake. A.J. Atwell was a Visalia attorney (and newspaper owner) who raised hogs on the island.  The lake at different times supported a very large Native American population, a commercial fishery, herds of tule elk, countless game birds, and much more. The island was a regular port of call for the lake's commercial ferry service. The last time the lake was brim full and overflowed into the San Joaquin River to the sea was 1878.  Water diversions of its source waters have since caused the lake to shrink into the tiny remnant of today. Local efforts have been undertaken to increase the lake's size for water storage and wildlife.

Los Angeles real estate developers, the California Home Extension Association, promoted, developed or founded Alpaugh, nearby Wasco, and several other California towns. It has also been referred to as "W.H. Wilber's Second Home Extension Coloney [that] purchased eight-thousand acres of land surrounding [Alpaugh]."  Los Angeles newspaper articles of the time explained that they were not the original landowners. "The California Home Extension association does not represent land owners; it has no lands of its own for sale.'."
On 17 December 1905, an article headlined "BUY IN TOWN OF ALPAUGH, CAL" ran in the Los Angeles Herald with the subheadline: "PURCHASE OF 11,000 ACRES BY COLONISTS." It says in part: Eight Hundred Families to Settle in the Beautiful and Productive San Joaquin Valley for Homes and Profit  

Alpaugh is the name of the new town In Tulare county, that was selected by the board of directors of the California Home Extension association and was visited by 200 members last week, all of whom are delighted with the choice of their governing board. 

 Everything will now be made ready for the 800 families, consisting of about 3000 people, who will assemble in Los Angeles to go in a body to the new town and settle within a few weeks.  

 These settlers have purchased about 11,000 acres and all have agreed to place valuable improvements on each and every acre adjoining the townsite. This settling of all the acreage will make the new townsite of Alpaugh very valuable and any one securing one or more lots wil surely reap a good profit, for values will rise very fast and high. 

 There are not many lots in the new townsite left, but there are many good openings for business men in the new townsite, for there will be from three to five thousand people ready to do business with when the people move to the acreage. 

On 21 January 1906 — Page 19, an article headlined "ALL ABOARD FOR ALPAUGH" ran in the Los Angeles Herald with the subheadline: "Day Fixed for Distribution of Town Lots to Enthusiastic Colonists", it says: 
  Announcement is made by the California Home Extension association that the town lots in the new townsite of Alpaugh, in Tulare county, will be distributed to colonists on Thursday afternoon, January 25, in Blanchard hall, 233 South Broadway.   
The acreage lots will not be distributed until a few days afterwards, and another circular will be sent out from the Home Extension office as soon as the Tulare county surveyor sends down the official map.
It was decided best to get the town lot distribution out of the way of the acreage distribution, as the latter is likely to take up a whole day.    
The town lot distribution will also allow the merchants, hotel and restaurant men to go ahead and erect accommodations on the lots they select and have things in good shape for an orderly and well arranged incoming of the acreage holders. There are, about thirty or forty people on the grounds at Alpaugh and they want to select their lots so that they can abandon their temporary tent camp and put up good accommodations for the people soon to come in.  
 
This colonization plan has been done to attract attention to California. The first colony established by the association at Clark City, now Greenfield, in Monterey county, has rapidly grown in population and substantial improvements. There are now many business houses and over sixty cottages erected at Greenfield.  

Alpaugh colonists assert that their town will boom at once, and that the Gordon Harris vegetable concentrating industry will be an important factor in the line of speedy development. Many colonists have already completed arrangements to go to Alpaugh soon after the lots are distributed.  
 

However, just one week before, that newspaper printed this, headline  NEW INDUSTRY AT ALPAUGH   
Colonists Will Find a Profitable Market at Home for AII Their Products   

The California Home Extension association has purchased a fertile tract of land in Tulare county, comprising 11,000 acres [17.2 sq.mi.], in the center of which the town of Alpaugh is to be located.    

The Second Home Extension Produce company has been organized with a capital stock of $50,000. The purpose of this company is to establish at once a fully equipped factory plant where concentrated vegetables and fruit products will be manufactured. This will create a market for all vegetables and fruits raised during the year by the colonists,....

In 1920 and 1921 both oil and large gas fields were found near Alpaugh.

Demographics

2010
At the 2010 census Alpaugh had a population of 1,026. The racial makeup of Alpaugh was 381 (37.1%) White, 4 (0.4%) African American, 11 (1.1%) Native American, 4 (0.4%) Asian, 0 (0.0%) Pacific Islander, 597 (58.2%) from other races, and 29 (2.8%) from two or more races. Hispanic or Latino of any race were 867 people (84.5%).

The whole population lived in households, no one lived in non-institutionalized group quarters and no one was institutionalized.

There were 226 households, 142 (62.8%) had children under the age of 18 living in them, 123 (54.4%) were opposite-sex married couples living together, 45 (19.9%) had a female householder with no husband present, 26 (11.5%) had a male householder with no wife present.  There were 32 (14.2%) unmarried opposite-sex partnerships, and 2 (0.9%) same-sex married couples or partnerships. 21 households (9.3%) were one person and 11 (4.9%) had someone living alone who was 65 or older. The average household size was 4.54.  There were 194 families (85.8% of households); the average family size was 4.83.

The age distribution was 434 people (42.3%) under the age of 18, 130 people (12.7%) aged 18 to 24, 244 people (23.8%) aged 25 to 44, 156 people (15.2%) aged 45 to 64, and 62 people (6.0%) who were 65 or older.  The median age was 21.8 years. For every 100 females, there were 107.3 males.  For every 100 females age 18 and over, there were 106.3 males.

There were 243 housing units at an average density of 241.8 per square mile, of the occupied units 120 (53.1%) were owner-occupied and 106 (46.9%) were rented. The homeowner vacancy rate was 1.6%; the rental vacancy rate was 0.9%.  522 people (50.9% of the population) lived in owner-occupied housing units and 504 people (49.1%) lived in rental housing units.

2000
At the 2000 census there were 761 people in 223 households, including 167 families, in the CDP. The racial makeup of the CDP was 47.17% White, 0.26% African American, 2.50% Native American, 1.84% Asian, 43.10% from other races, and 5.12% from two or more races. Hispanic or Latino of any race were 54.14%.

Of the 223 households 42.6% had children under the age of 18 living with them, 53.4% were married couples living together, 13.0% had a female householder with no husband present, and 25.1% were non-families. 21.5% of households were one person and 7.2% were one person aged 65 or older.  The average household size was 3.41 and the average family size was 3.89.

The age distribution was 37.8% under the age of 18, 10.5% from 18 to 24, 28.0% from 25 to 44, 15.5% from 45 to 64, and 8.1% 65 or older.  The median age was 26 years. For every 100 females, there were 102.4 males.  For every 100 females age 18 and over, there were 97.1 males.

The median household income was $23,688 and the median family income  was $23,854. Males had a median income of $21,250 versus $16,875 for females. The per capita income for the CDP was $8,162.  About 28.0% of families and 37.9% of the population were below the poverty line, including 50.4% of those under age 18 and 3.0% of those age 65 or over.

Government

Railroads
Alpaugh is served by the West Isle Line, a private carrier railroad owned by Western Farm Services.  Since 1998 the West Isle Line has operated over the  "Alpaugh Branch" of the former Atchison, Topeka and Santa Fe Railway. The West Isle Line runs east from Alpaugh to a connection with the BNSF Railway at "Stoil".  The "Alpaugh Branch" was constructed in 1914.

References

Census-designated places in Tulare County, California
Census-designated places in California